Nikita Andreyevich Pechyonkin (born 16 June 1997) is a Russian football player. He plays for FC Volgar Astrakhan.

Club career
He made his debut in the Russian Football National League for FC Volgar Astrakhan on 14 August 2021 in a game against FC Krasnodar-2.

References

External links
 
 
 Profile by Russian Football National League

1997 births
Sportspeople from Chelyabinsk Oblast
Living people
Russian footballers
Association football defenders
FC Volgar Astrakhan players
Russian First League players
Russian Second League players